She Wears My Ring is a studio album by country music artist Ray Price. It was released in 1968 by Columbia Records (catalog no. CS-9733).

The album debuted on Billboard magazine's country album chart on January 8, 1969, peaked at No. 6, and remained on the chart for a total of 21 weeks. The album included two singles that became Top 20 hits: "She Wears My Ring" (No. 6) and "I've Been There Before" (No. 11).

AllMusic gave the album three stars.

Track listing
Side A
 "She Wears My Ring"
 "Little Green Apples"
 "Set Me Free" (Curly Putman, Marvin Walters) 
 "Walking on the Grass" (Ray Pennington)
 "Remembering" (Jerry Reed)
 "Goin' Away" (George Tomsco)

Side B
 "By the Time I Get to Phoenix"
 "I'm Gonna Change Everything" (Alex Zanetis)
 "Trouble" (William Lee Ellis / Jule Styne)
 "I've Been There Before" (Bobby Gosh)
 "Welcome to My World"

References

1969 albums
Ray Price (musician) albums
Columbia Records albums